Paolo Ferrari may refer to:

 Paolo Ferrari (actor) (1929–2018), Italian actor
 Paolo Ferrari (writer) (1822–1889), Italian dramatist